Minuscule 46 (in the Gregory-Aland numbering), ε 1285 (Von Soden), is a Greek minuscule manuscript of the New Testament, on parchment leaves. Paleographically it has been assigned to the 13th century. It has complex contents and full marginalia.

Description 

The codex contains the complete text of the four Gospels on 342 leaves (size ). The text is written stichometrically in one column per page, 18 lines per page.

There is also another division according to the smaller Ammonian Sections (in Matthew 355; Mark 241 – 16:20, Luke 342, John 232 sections) with references to the Eusebian Canons.

Text 

The Greek text of the codex is a representative of the Byzantine text-type. Aland placed it in Category V.

According to the Claremont Profile Method it represents textual family Kx in Luke 1 and Luke 20. In Luke 10 no profile was made. It creates cluster 46.

According to Gregory its text often agrees with Minuscule 52 and 61.

History 

The manuscript was dated by Scholz to the 15th, by Scrivener to the 11th century and by Gregory to 12th century. Currently it has been assigned by the INTF to the 13th century.

The date of the codex is estimated between 1296 and 1318.

The manuscript once belonged to Micheal Zorianos, to Francesco Barozzi (hence name of the codex).

It was examined by Mill (as Bodl. 2) and Griesbach.

The manuscript was added to the list of the New Testament manuscripts by J. J. Wettstein. C. R. Gregory saw it in 1883.

It is currently housed in at the Bodleian Library (Barocci 29), at Oxford.

See also 

 List of New Testament minuscules
 Biblical manuscript
 Textual criticism

References

Further reading 

 J. J. Griesbach, Symbolae critica, Vol. 1, p. CLXXI.

External links 
 MS. Barocci 29 Images available on Digital Bodleian
 MS. Barocci 29 on the Bodleian Libraries Medieval Manuscripts Catalogue

Greek New Testament minuscules
13th-century biblical manuscripts
Bodleian Library collection